Joakim Nyström and Mats Wilander were the defending champions, but Wilander did not compete this year. Nyström teamed up with Henrik Sundström and lost in the semifinals to Jan Gunnarsson and Michael Mortensen.

Gunnarsson and Mortensen won the title by defeating Juan Avendaño and Fernando Roese 6–0, 6–0 in the final.

Seeds

Draw

Draw

References

External links
 Official results archive (ATP)
 Official results archive (ITF)

Men's Doubles
Doubles